The Best of Dramarama: 18 Big Ones is a compilation album by alternative rock group Dramarama, released in 1996.

Track listing
 "Anything, Anything (I'll Give You)" – 3:24
 "Scenario" – 4:16
 "Emerald City" – 3:03
 "Steve & Edie" – 5:05
 "It's Still Warm" – 3:54
 "Wonderamaland" – 4:08
 "No Regrets" – 3:53
 "Last Cigarette" – 4:56
 "Haven't Got a Clue" – 4:02
 "What Are We Gonna Do?" – 3:59
 "Train Going Backwards" – 6:17
 "Classic Rot" – 4:26
 "Work for Food" – 4:09
 "Incredible" – 4:17
 "Senseless Fun" – 4:35
 "7 Minutes (More or Less)" – 4:10
 "Sincerely" – 2:51
 "Goin' Blind" – 6:59

"Goin' Blind" is a cover of the Kiss song from Hotter Than Hell.

The extra track after "Goin' Blind" is an acoustic version of "Work for Food."

References 

1996 compilation albums
Dramarama compilation albums
Rhino Records compilation albums